Sundog Powerchutes Inc was a Canadian aircraft manufacturer based in Sparwood, British Columbia and later in Pierceland, Saskatchewan. The company specialized in the design and manufacture of powered parachutes in the form of ready-to-fly aircraft for the Canadian Basic Ultra-Light Aeroplane category and which also fit the European Fédération Aéronautique Internationale microlight category.

The company seems to have been founded about 2002 and gone out of business in 2014.

The company built two models of powered parachute, the Two-Seater and One-Seater, both similar designs made from 6061-T6 aluminium tubing. In reviewing the aircraft in 2003 Jean-Pierre le Camus described their design as having, "a lot of character".

Aircraft

References

External links
Company website archives on Archive.org

Defunct aircraft manufacturers of Canada
Ultralight aircraft
Powered parachutes
2002 establishments in British Columbia
2014 disestablishments in Saskatchewan
Canadian companies disestablished in 2014
Canadian companies established in 2002